Peter Cincotti is the first studio album by jazz pianist, singer and composer Peter Cincotti, released on the Concord label, produced by Phil Ramone.

Track listing
I Changed the Rules – 5:14
Comes Love - 4:18
Are You the One? - 3:55
Sway - 4:12
Miss Brown - 4:17
Lovers, Secrets, Lies - 3:46
The Fool on the Hill/Nature Boy - 3:47
Ain't Misbehavin' - 3:43
Come Live Your Life With Me (The Godfather Waltz) - 4:46
Spinning Wheel - 3:10
You Stepped Out of a Dream - 3:18
Rainbow Connection - 4:01

Chart performance

References

Peter Cincotti albums
Albums produced by Phil Ramone
2003 debut albums